Diabetes, in particular, non-insulin dependent diabetes, is prevalent in the Aboriginal and Torres Strait Islander populations of Australia. As many as 1 in 20 Australians are said to suffer from diabetes, and of this amount, Aboriginal people are three times as likely to succumb to this disease, in comparison to non-Aboriginal people. In contrast with type 1 diabetes, which is a predisposed autoimmune condition, type 2 diabetes or insulin-resistant diabetes, is a preventable disease, heavily influenced by a multitude of socioeconomic factors. Sufferers of the disease are consequently more susceptible to chronic health issues, including heart disease and kidney failure. Conclusively, this has contributed to the 17 year life expectancy gap between Aboriginal people and non-Aboriginal people and in turn, has led to disparity and inequity of health between Aboriginal people and non-Aboriginal people.

History 
The history of Aboriginal Australians is said to have spanned some 60,000 years prior to colonization, yet they were first cited by Europeans in 1606. Further investigations of the land over the years leading to James Cook's arrival in 1769-70, suggested that the Aboriginal people were hunter gatherers, who were described as "beasts who roamed the land". Fully utilising the resources at their disposal, the diet of the early Aboriginal people was predominantly made up of land animals, fish and shellfish, as well as birds and plant foods. (Note that some historians dispute this, such as Bill Gammage and Bruce Pascoe (in his Dark Emu).)

Post colonisation, the Aboriginal people experienced excessive disruptions to their socioeconomic circumstances and thus, this has seen a rapid decline in their health status. Forced to assimilate into a white, European Society, Aboriginal people abandoned their traditional way of living and reluctantly adopted those of the colony. Over time this has seen the introduction of sugar and refined foods into the diet of Aboriginal Australians, initially to sever existing connections to the land. Aboriginal people have since viewed sugar as an important cultural food, bringing with it, family identities and reinforcing connections. Hence, Aboriginal people have since become highly vulnerable to suffering from conditions such as diabetes.

Causes

European influence 
The prevalence of type 2 diabetes, obesity and the corresponding diseases that are associated with this condition, are often attributed to the European influences at the time of colonisation. Sugar and refined foods were used at this time as a means of detaching Aboriginal people from the land and assimilating them into white society. Consequently, Aboriginal Australians have likened certain traditions and memories to the use of sugar. Thus, the ‘westernisation’ of Aboriginal communities forced the neglect of a nutrient-dense diet and thus, cemented the foundation for this prevailing condition.

Remoteness 
Remoteness of Aboriginal communities and disparity in socioeconomic circumstances has also contributed to the prevalence of diabetes in Aboriginal Australians. Consequently, refined foods have seemingly replaced healthy alternatives, as communities are denied access to fresh and healthy foods due to limited available resources. Similarly, many Aboriginal people are said to live in poverty, with community's dependent on welfare and most being plagued by unemployment. Development of dependence on tobacco and alcohol has forced their need to be frugal with their money for healthy foods such as green vegetables and fruits, and in turn, only being able to afford energy dense, filling foods, which are often high in fats and sugar. Hence, there is a direct correlation between the disparity of wealth, obesity and subsequent morbidity. Consequently, this is a main contributor to Aboriginal people and Torres Strait Islanders being 2-4 more times likely to suffer from this condition.

Health inequalities 
Health inequalities in society and lack of education can also contribute to the higher diagnosis of diabetes among Aboriginal and Torres Strait Islanders.

Unutilised resources 
Similarly, Aboriginal people are recognised as not utilising the health resources at their disposal. Bush tucker being the main staple prior to european settlement which low in natural sugars and no refined sugars is not being utilised even in remote communities due to the high dependence on western diets high in fats and refined sugar. As a result, Australian Aboriginal people are said to be lacking in diabetes education and the subsequent monitoring of glucose levels, making them more susceptible to diabetes related problems as well as lack of educational knowledge and ill-informed in making decisions in regards to their health.

Low birth weights 
Aboriginal infants are also said to have relatively lower birth weights than normal, which can also contribute to early incidences of type 2 diabetes.

Lifestyle 
As well as being genetically predisposition are found commonly in young-onset diabetic patients. Diabetes is not a single gene disease, autoimmunity, rare gene variants and a common variant may be present in a single individual. type 2 diabetes is also associated with obesity and other cardiovascular factors and lifestyle influences. Thus, those with high blood pressure, a poor diet, insufficient physical activity and are overweight/ obese, and in the case of Aboriginal Australians, are over the age of 35, are increasingly more susceptible to suffering from type 2 diabetes.

Pregnancy
Gestational diabetes refers to gluten intolerance diabetes diagnosed during pregnancy and is highly common among Aboriginal Australians.

Complications 
Type 2 diabetes is a detrimental condition commonly affecting Aboriginal Australians. It is closely associated with obesity and is often a precursor for subsequent preventable diseases, including cardiovascular and renal disease. Hence, diabetes is a major cause of the premature mortality of many Aboriginal Australians.

Increased occurrence of renal complications among Aboriginal people is attributed to environmental and genetic factors, as well as poor monitoring of glucose levels. Low birth weight causing lower renal volume, post infectious renal damage and obesity are also characteristically associated with chronic kidney disease and end stage kidney failure.  Consequently, Australian Aboriginal people are 8 times more likely to suffer from incidences of kidney failure than non-Aboriginal Australians.

Similarly, cardiovascular disease is the single greatest contributor to the disparity in life expectancy between Aboriginal and non-Aboriginal Australians. Obesity and increased waist circumference is an important risk factor, along with other modifiable influences including smoking, high blood pressure, high cholesterol levels, low levels of physical activity. All of which contribute to the incidence of diabetes and consequently, cardiovascular disease. Moreover, gestational diabetes is a complication that not only causes harm to pregnant women but also leads to complications and diabetes if the fetus.

The prevalence of type 2 diabetes in Aboriginal Australians can also lead to retinopathy, whereby blood vessels in the eye are damaged as a direct result of this condition. Peripheral neuropathy is also common in diabetes patients and in some cases can lead to chronic foot problems and even amputations.

Prevention 

Health issues affecting Aboriginal Australians, including the incidence of type 2 diabetes, are often likened to disparities in socioeconomic status. Often, the greater the social and economic disadvantage, the greater the occurrence of diabetes and other associated conditions.  Thus, improvements in the socioeconomic status and the decrease in disparity and health inequality are detrimental if the incidence of diabetes and the associated conditions are to be reduced.

Early detection programs and diabetes screenings are essential in reducing the frequency of diabetes and its long-term effects. Moreover, regular weight assessment should be done. Promotion of healthy eating and physical activity, smoking cessation and the safe consumption of alcohol are also vital to reduce and prevent type 2 diabetes. The Australian government has addressed the need for such intervention by implementing the National Prevention of Type 2 Diabetes program. Arguably, such programs need to be supported by efforts to provide greater employment and educational opportunities for Aboriginal Australians and health programs tailored to their favoured holistic approach to health and wellbeing.

Statistics 
One in 20 Australian adults had diabetes in 2011–2012.

Aboriginal people and Torres Strait Islander people are 2–4 times more likely to suffer from diabetes than other non-indigenous groups.

Evidence of diabetes among Aboriginal people is apparent as early as 25 years of age. Approximately 18% of Aboriginal and Torres Strait Islanders over the age of 25 reported having diabetes or high blood sugar levels. The rates range from 5% for those in the 25 years age bracket and increasing to 39% for those aged 55 years and over.

In 2012–2013, approximately 8% of Aboriginal and Torres Strait Islanders reported that they had diabetes or high blood sugar levels. Females were more likely than men to suffer from diabetes, with 10% claiming to suffer from the condition, in comparison to 7% of males.

References 

Diabetes
Aboriginal Australian health